Super Sidekicks is a 1992 soccer arcade video game developed and published by SNK. It is the first installment in the eponymous series and the second soccer game released for Neo Geo MVS, succeeding Soccer Brawl (1991). Featuring an arcade-style approach to soccer compared to other games released at the time, the title allows players to choose any of the available game modes with AI-controlled opponents or other human players with the team of their choosing. Its gameplay uses a simplified two-button configuration.

Headed by Eikichi Kawasaki, Super Sidekicks was developed by most of the same team that worked on several projects for the Neo Geo platforms at SNK. Though first launched for the MVS hardware, the game was later released for both Neo Geo AES and Neo Geo CD, in addition of being re-released through download services for various consoles. The title proved popular among players and garnered positive reception from critics; praise was directed towards the graphic presentation and fast gameplay but criticism was geared towards several aspects. It was followed by various sequels and a remake.

Gameplay 

Super Sidekicks is a soccer game that is played from a top-down perspective in a two-dimensional environment with sprites. Although it follows the same gameplay as with other soccer titles at the time and most of the rules are present as well, the game opts for a more arcade-styled approach of the sport instead of being full simulation, using a simplified control scheme. The tile features 12 teams divided into two groups which compete for the "SNK Cup": Group A (Germany, Italy, Spain, England, Mexico, Japan) and Group B (Argentina, Holland, Brazil, France, United States, South Korea).

The players' team plays against all the others in their group, then it goes into an elimination tournament's semifinals and then the final to win the cup. There is an hidden mechanic in the game that affects single-player matches; During a free kick for the AI opponent, if the player has tapped button A for player two, the AI performs a short-shot while pressing the button A performs a longer kick. One noted mistake was that Spain's kit resembles Portugal's, which would not be featured until future entries. Another mistake is Mexico's uniform color, which was corrected in the sequels.

Development and release 

Super Sidekicks was the second soccer game developed for the Neo Geo MVS after Soccer Brawl, being created by most of the same team that worked on multiple projects for the Neo Geo platforms at SNK such as Ghost Pilots and Alpha Mission II. Producer Eikichi Kawasaki headed its creation, with Kenji "Ishimotti" Ishimoto acting as designer. Shinsekai Gakkyoku Zatsugidan members Yoshihiko "Jojouha Kitapy" Kitamura and Yoko Osaka handled the sound design. Masato "Mioshi" Miyoshi, "S K", "Younger Face", Eri Koujitani, J. Mikami and Mori-P were responsible for the pixel art. Programmers under the pseudonym "Mabushi", "Narutaki" and "EP82boy" were in charge of coding. Other members collaborated in its development. The SNK staff wanted to translate the spectacle and action of their fighting games into soccer.

Super Sidekicks was first released by SNK for the Neo Geo MVS on December 14, 1992, and was then released for Neo Geo AES on February 19, 1993. It was showcased at the 1993 IMA show in Frankfurt. The game was later re-released for the Neo Geo CD in Japan on March 31, 1995, and later in North America in October 1996. In 2010, a version by M2 for the NEOGEO Station service was published by SNK Playmore on PlayStation Network. The title is available as one of the 20 pre-loaded games with the Neo Geo X. Hamster Corporation re-released the game for the Nintendo Switch, PlayStation 4 and Xbox One in July 2017 under their Arcade Archives series. The title was also recently included in the international version of the Neo Geo mini, the Neo Geo Arcade Stick Pro plug and play game device and the Neo Geo MVSX table top.

Reception 

Super Sidekicks garnered positive reception from players and critics. In Japan,  listed Super Sidekicks on their March 1, 1993 issue as being the fourth most-popular arcade game at the time. RePlay reported Super Sidekicks to be the tenth most-popular arcade game at the time. Marc Menier and Robert Barbe of  criticized the presentation but praised the graphics, animations, sound design, playability and longevity, stating that "Super Sidekicks wonderfully recreates the frenzied atmosphere of football matches." Christophe Delpierre of  gave very high remarks to the visual presentation, sound design, playability, difficulty and longevity. Andreas Knauf of  complemented the detailed graphics and playability, regarding the game to be better than Soccer Brawl. Paolo Cardillo of  praised the visuals, audio, playability and longevity, stating that Super Sidekicks is "undoubtedly fun, but much more was expected from the Neo Geo." Likewise, Piemarco Rosa of  commended the visuals, sprite animations and arcade-perfect gameplay but criticized the sound design for being inappropriate.

Megablasts Michael Schnelle commended the visuals but felt mixed about other aspects. Hobby Consolass Marcos García gave high remarks to the visuals, sound design and playability, regarding Super Sidekicks as "the most direct, fun and addictive soccer in the history of video games." However, García criticized the small team roster and the lack of certain gameplay aspects. Jean-François Morisse and Nourdine Nini of  praised the graphics, animations, controls and sound design but criticized the slowdown that occurs when too many sprites are present in penalty areas. G. S. of  criticized the sound but praised both visuals and gameplay. Electronic Gaming Monthlys four reviewers commented positively in regards to the visuals, sound design and gameplay. German magazine  reviewed and praised the title several times, with both Uwe Kraft and Ulf Schneider commending the visuals and sound. Similarly, GameFans four reviewers gave positive remarks to the visual department and fast gameplay.

Javier Iturrioz of  commended the visual presentation, simple controls and gameplay, stating that "many think that the enormous playability of this game has never been surpassed by any of its continuations." However, Iturrioz noted that the gameplay options do not vary much. AllGames Kyle Knight gave positive remarks to the visuals and gameplay but criticized the sound design and controls, stating that "Super Sidekicks is truly a mixed bag. At times it's very enjoyable, while at others it's equally frustrating."

Retrospective reviews 

Super Sidekicks has been met with mixed reception from retrospective reviewers in recent years. VentureBeats Daav Valentaten noted its colorful graphics, fast action, simple controls but criticized the inability to choose players, precision to steal the ball from opponents and framerate in the PlayStation Network version. In 2014, HobbyConsolas identified it as one of the twenty best games for the Neo Geo AES. Elliott Osange of Bonus Stage stated that "Super Sidekicks will appeal to fans from the NEO GEO era and diehard football fans who need something to fill the void in their lives. For casual sports players and non-sport entities, however, this is going to be a hard pass."

A staff member of German magazine  reviewed the PlayStation Network version via PlayStation Portable, noting the difficulty level of AI-controlled opponents and praised the visual presentation, regarding the game to be quite entertaining but recommended playing its sequels. Pure Nintendo Magazines Trevor Gould commended the large sprites, gameplay speed, sound design and visual presentation.

Nintendo Lifes Dave Frear praised its fast gameplay and visual presentation but criticized the lack of additiona replay value, options and teams. Nintendo World Reports J.P. Cobran criticized the controls, the disjointed gameplay for being choppy and the zoomed perspective.

Legacy 
Super Sidekicks spawned a series of three sequels and a remake; Super Sidekicks 2: The World Championship (1994), Super Sidekicks 3: The Next Glory (1995), The Ultimate 11: SNK Football Championship (1996) and Neo Geo Cup '98: The Road to the Victory (1998). The Ultimate 11 proved to be less popular than its predecessors, while Neo Geo Cup '98 served as the final game in the series. Mexican magazine Club Nintendo regarded the Super Sidekicks franchise as one of the best soccer sagas in video games, touting it to be better than Sega's Virtua Striker series.

Notes

References

External links 

 Super Sidekicks at GameFAQs
 Super Sidekicks at Giant Bomb
 Super Sidekicks at Killer List of Videogames
 Super Sidekicks at MobyGames

1992 video games
ACA Neo Geo games
Arcade video games
Association football video games
Multiplayer and single-player video games
Neo Geo games
Neo Geo CD games
Nintendo Switch games
PlayStation Network games
PlayStation 4 games
SNK games
SNK Playmore games
Video games developed in Japan
Xbox One games
Hamster Corporation games